Twm Morys (born 1961) is a Welsh poet and musician.

Biography
Twm Morys was born in 1961 in Oxford, a son to the writer Jan Morris. He was brought up in Llanystumdwy and attended Ysgol y Llan, before attending Marshcourt boarding school at the age of seven, and then Shrewsbury School. 
Morys returned to Wales to study a Welsh-language A-level  at Brecon Comprehensive School. 
Morys graduated from the University of Wales, Aberystwyth with a degree in Celtic Studies; he also won the inter-collegiate chair whilst at the university.

He has worked for BBC Radio Cymru as a researcher and later as a poet and singer.

Morys later moved to Brittany, where he lived for ten years and worked as a lecturer at the University of Rennes.

In addition to two volumes of poetry, Twm Morys has written essays for literary reviews. 
He has collaborated with his parent Jan Morris on two volumes, Wales, the First Place (Random House, 1982), and A Machynlleth Triad/Triawd Machynlleth (Penguin, 1994). Ein Llyw Cyntaf (Gomer, 2001) is his Welsh adaptation of Jan Morris's novel Our First Leader. He won the chair at the 2003 National Eisteddfod for his poem Drysau (Doors).

He also writes for television and radio, as well as lyrics, which he sings with the folk-rock group, Bob Delyn a'r Ebillion.

Twm Morys was the Bardd Plant Cymru (Welsh children's poet laureate) for 2009–2010, and since 2011, he has been editor of the Welsh poetry magazine Barddas. He won the Chair of the National Eisteddfod in Meifod in 2003.

He lives in Llanystumdwy, Wales.

Bibliography

Poetry
Ofn Fy Het, Barddas (1995)
Mymryn Bach o Hon (1998)
2, Barddas (2002)

Prose
Grwyne Fawr, cyfres 'Y Man a’r Lle', Gwasg Gregynog (1998)

Work with Jan Morris
Wales, the First Place, Random House (1982)
A Machynlleth Triad, Penguin (1994)
Ein Llyw Cyntaf, Gomer (2001)

References

1961 births
Chaired bards
Living people
Welsh poets
Welsh-language singers
Welsh-language poets
People from Oxford
Welsh male singers
Alumni of Aberystwyth University